Trio (stylized as TR!O) was an American cable and satellite television network.

Trio went on the air in 1994, then originally owned and operated jointly by the Canadian Broadcasting Corporation and Power Broadcasting Inc. (a subsidiary of Power Corporation of Canada) along with 24-hour international news channel Newsworld International. The channel served as a venue for airing the CBC's arts, culture and entertainment programming in the U.S. It was sold to USA Networks in 2000, and was subsequently transferred to Vivendi Universal and later NBC Universal.

With the slogan, "pop, culture, TV", Trio programming under Vivendi/NBC Universal ownership focused on television as a cultural tool and art form.

In January 2005, Trio was dropped from DirecTV, eliminating about two-thirds of the homes that could receive the network. On November 21, 2005, NBC Universal announced that the Trio brand would be transferred to a broadband Internet TV initiative under the Bravotv.com banner on January 1, 2006. Cable and satellite providers still carrying Trio were offered a new NBC Universal cable network instead, called Sleuth, which was renamed Cloo in 2011. On February 1, 2017, Cloo would shut down, thus the channel space once occupied by Trio ceased to exist.

Notable Trio programs

Original
 The N-Word, Peabody Award–winning documentary starring Whoopi Goldberg, Samuel L. Jackson and many other African American celebrities discussing the origin and power of the word nigger.
 Outlaw Comic: The Censoring of Bill Hicks, documentary hosted by Janeane Garofalo, focusing on his David Letterman appearances, especially his last one, where he was cut from the program.
 The Award Show Awards Show, examination of America's obsession with awards
 The Christmas Special Christmas Special
 Film Fanatic, cinema, hosted by Amy Sedaris
 Flops 101: Lessons from the Biz
 TV's Most Censored Moments, a documentary about censorship in television.  
 The Blockbuster Imperative, a documentary about Hollywood's obsession with blockbuster movies.

Reruns

 Adrenaline Junkies (a.k.a. Medivac)
 Airline
 All Saints
 Battle of the Network Stars
 Black Harbour
 Blue Heelers
 Brides of Christ
 Bugs
 Coming Home
 Coronation Street
 Counterstrike
 Cracker
 The Dame Edna Experience
 The Damnation of Harvey McHugh
 Deepwater Black
 Degrassi
 Dog House
 The Dreamstone (airs 1995)
 Duggan
 EGG, the Arts Show
 E.N.G.
 The Fifth Estate
 Flightpath (Canadian TV series)
 Good Guys, Bad Guys
 Hot Type
 Judy Garland Show Christmas Special
 Kath & Kim
 Late Night with David Letterman
 The Little Flying Bears (airs 1996)
 The Littlest Hobo
 London's Burning
 Madison
 Max Glick
 McCallum
 MediaTelevision
 Mercury
 Mr. Dressup
 Mysterious Island
 Nancherrow
 The Nature of Things
 New York Undercover
 North of 60
 Northwood
 Once Upon a Hamster
 Pink Lady
 Queen for a Day
 The Raccoons (airs 1997)
 Rowan & Martin's Laugh-In
 SCTV
 The Secret Rulers of the World
 Sessions at West 54th
 Spaced
 Street Legal
 Taggart
 Traders
 Undercurrents
 A Very British Coup
 Young People's Concerts

Brilliant But Cancelled
This was the umbrella title under which Trio aired repeats of series that had very short lives on mainstream broadcast television, yet were still considered to be programming that "broke the mold" of what was normally expected from the "Big Three" networks. Series that appeared under the Brilliant But Cancelled umbrella included:

 Action
 Bakersfield P.D.
 Brideshead Revisited
 Charlie Cobb: Nice Night for a Hanging
 Diner (pilot)
 East Side/West Side
 The Ernie Kovacs Show
 EZ Streets
 Fargo (pilot)
 God, the Devil and Bob
 Johnny Staccato
 Kolchak: The Night Stalker
 L.A. Confidential (pilot)
 Lookwell (pilot)
 Now and Again
 Parenthood
 Profit
 The PJs
 United States

Brilliant But Cancelled was later used by Universal as a title for a series of DVDs that feature samples of short-lived series. Two of these have been released so far—one of these a sampler of short-lived crime drama series; another was selected episodes of EZ Streets.

Flops
Special airing of shows that flopped.

 Cop Rock
 My Mother the Car
 Pink Lady and Jeff
(The Secret Diary of Desmond Pfeiffer was supposed to air, but was pulled due to the controversial nature of the program, which played for laughs the relationship between a black nobleman and President Abraham Lincoln during the American Civil War).

Schedule Lineup

Kids Block

08:00 AM – The Raccoons

08:30 AM – Once Upon a Hamster

09:00 AM – Mr. Dressup

09:30 AM – The Littlest Hobo

10:00 AM – The Raccoons

10:30 AM – Once Upon a Hamster

11:00 AM – Mr. Dressup

11:30 AM – The Littlest Hobo

Lifestyle

12:00 PM – Taste of Life

12:30 PM – Canadian Gardener

Red Hot Dramas

01:00 PM – Blue Heelers

02:00 PM – North of 60

03:00 PM – Street Legal

04:00 PM – Murdoch Mysteries

After-School Theatre

05:00 PM – Northwood

05:30 PM – (Monday; Max Glick)
05:30 PM – (Tuesday; Mysterious Island)
05:30 PM – (Wednesday; Dog House)
05:30 PM – (Thursday; Madison)
05:30 PM – (Friday; Deepwater Black)

06:00 PM – (Saturday; Degrassi)

06:30 PM – (Saturday; Street Cents)

In-Style

06:00 PM – SCTV

06:30 PM – Fashion File

Highway 7

07:00 PM – (Monday; Coltrane in the Cadillac)
07:00 PM – (Tuesday; The Fifth Estate)
07:00 PM – (Wednesday; Flightpath)
07:00 PM – (Thursday; Frost’s Century)
07:00 PM – (Friday; Undercurrents

07:30 PM – (Friday; MediaTelevision)

Dramarama

Mondays only

08:00 PM – Black Harbour
08:30 PM – North of 60

Tuesdays only

08:00 PM – Street Legal
08:30 PM – Mercury

Wednesdays only

08:00 PM – Noah’s Ark
08:30 PM – Murdoch Mysteries

Thursdays only

08:00 PM – London’s Burning
08:30 PM – Traders

Fridays only

08:00 PM – Counterstrike
08:30 PM – McCallum

References

External links
 Variety Review of TV's Most Censored Moments  
 Variety Review of The Award Show Awards Show

Former Canadian Broadcasting Corporation television networks
Defunct television networks in the United States
NBCUniversal networks
Peabody Award winners
Power Corporation of Canada
Television channels and stations disestablished in 2006
Television channels and stations established in 1994